Alexandrov Gay (Alǵaı) is a rural locality (a selo) and the administrative center of Alexandrovo-Gaysky District of Saratov Oblast, Russia, located near the Russo-Kazakh border. Population:

History
It was founded in 1762.

Economy
It is an entry point to Russia for natural gas trunklines from Central Asia (Central Asia-Center gas pipeline system) as also for the Russian natural gas export lines Soyuz and Orenburg–Novopskov.

Climate

References

Rural localities in Saratov Oblast
Populated places established in 1762
Novouzensky Uyezd